Ablaberoides flavipennis is a species of beetle first discovered in 1873. No sub-species are listed in the Catalogue of Life.

References

Beetles described in 1857
Scarabaeidae